Gheorghe Băcuț (also known as Gheorghe Băcuț I; 12 July 1927 – 24 July 1974) was a Romanian footballer who played as a right back for teams such as ITA Arad, Dinamo București or Progresul Oradea.

Career
Băcuț was an important player of ITA's golden generation, winning two titles with "the Provincial Champions" and one Romanian Cup. After that, he moved to Dinamo, where he won another national title, in 1955. His brother, Ladislau Băcuț was also a footballer, they played together at ITA Arad and Dinamo București.

International career
Gheorghe Băcuț played in 28 matches at international level for Romania, making his debut in a friendly against Hungary which ended with a 7–2 loss. He played in a 2–1 victory at the 1946 Balkan Cup against Yugoslavia, made three appearances at the 1947 Balkan Cup, scoring one goal in a 3–2 victory against Bulgaria and played another four games at the 1948 Balkan Cup. Băcuț also played in three games at the 1954 World Cup qualifiers.

Honours
ITA Arad
Divizia A: 1946–47, 1947–48
Cupa României: 1947–48

Dinamo București
Divizia A: 1955
Cupa României: Runner-up 1954

References

External links
 
 

1927 births
1974 deaths
Sportspeople from Oradea
Romanian footballers
Romania international footballers
Association football defenders
Liga I players
Liga II players
FC UTA Arad players
FC Dinamo București players
CA Oradea players